Alan Richardson (born 17 May 1965) is a former Australian rules footballer who is the former senior coach of the St Kilda Football Club in the Australian Football League (AFL).

He was previously the Director of Coaching at Port Adelaide and had earlier roles as an assistant coach at the Western Bulldogs, Collingwood, Essendon, Carlton and Port Adelaide. He is a former player with Collingwood and played 114 senior games and now works as an assistant coach at the Melbourne Football Club.

Playing career
Richardson had initially been listed at North Melbourne, where he played at reserves level, but was let go by the club without being able to break into the seniors.

Collingwood Football Club
A half back, he was given a second chance by Collingwood Football Club and made his league debut a week before his 22nd birthday, in 1987.

It was not until 1990 that he became a regular fixture in the Collingwood side and he participated in both qualifying finals against the West Coast Eagles, after the first was drawn. He also played in the semi final win over Essendon, which saw Collingwood make the grand final, but cracked his collarbone when he collided with Adrian Burns. On the Thursday before the premiership decider, Richardson failed a fitness test after being bumped by his coach Leigh Matthews while walking off the ground. He was replaced by Shane Kerrison, a surprise inclusion ahead of Ron McKeown who had missed the semi final. Richardson retired at the end of the 1996 season. Richardson played a total of 114 games and kicking 10 goals for Collingwood Football Club.

Coaching career

Early coaching career
When his playing career ended, Richardson became a coach and was put in charge of his original club, East Burwood, in the Eastern Football League. He coached the seniors to premierships in 1999 and 2000. He was the senior coach of VFL club Coburg for the next two years.

Western Bulldogs
in 2003, he joined the Western Bulldogs as an assistant coach.

Collingwood Football Club
After three seasons at the Bulldogs, Richardson was appointed to Mick Malthouse's coaching staff at Collingwood and given the role of development manager.

Essendon Football Club
From 2008 to 2010 he was an assistant coach with Essendon.

Carlton Football Club
He joined the Carlton Football Club as an assistant coach in 2011, but was released at the end of the 2012 season because of the departure of senior coach Brett Ratten who was replaced by Mick Malthouse.

Port Adelaide Football Club
He then joined the Port Adelaide Football Club as a senior assistant and director of coaching for the 2013 season. On 4 May 2013, Richardson coached his first official AFL game as caretaker interim senior coach in place of regular senior coach Ken Hinkley, who was unavailable due to a virus. Port Adelaide under Richardson as stand-in senior coach for Hinkley, lost that game to North Melbourne by a margin of ten points in Round 6, 2013.

St Kilda Football Club
Richardson was appointed senior coach of St Kilda Football Club on 14 November 2013, when he replaced Scott Watters, who was sacked at the end of the 2013 season. Richardson received criticism by Port Adelaide over the late timing of the decision, being made only one week before the national draft. 

Richardson's coaching career at St Kilda started well with three wins from their first five games, however, the club would win only one game (against then-second placed  in Round 18) for the remainder of the 2014 season and crash to its first wooden spoon since 2000. After coaching the team to the brink of finals in 2016 and 2017, the Saints fell to 16th place in 2018. The 2019 season saw considerable scrutiny applied to Richardson and his coaching tenure. Although the Saints won four of their first five games, their subsequent poor record where the Saints under Richardson sat fifteenth (third-last) position on the ladder with six wins and ten losses, saw Richardson resign as St Kilda Football Club senior coach on 16 July 2019, in the middle of the 2019 season after Round 17, 2019. Richardson was then replaced by assistant coach Brett Ratten as caretaker senior coach of St Kilda Football Club for the remainder of the 2019 season, who was eventually appointed full-time senior coach of the St Kilda Football Club.

Melbourne Football Club
On 23 August, 2019, Richardson returned to coaching when he joined the Melbourne Football Club in an assistant coach role in preparation for the 2020 season. Richardson spent  the 2020 season in the assistant coaching position as the club's director of coaching. Richardson was then appointed to the position of the club's General Manager of AFL Football Performance in 2021.

Personal life
Richardson is married to Jo and they have two sons. He lives in the eastern suburbs of Melbourne.

Statistics

Playing statistics

|-
|- style="background-color: #EAEAEA"
! scope="row" style="text-align:center" | 1987
|style="text-align:center;"|
| 13 || 2 || 0 || 0 || 10 || 4 || 14 || 2 || 0 || 0.0 || 0.0 || 5.0 || 2.0 || 7.0 || 1.0 || 0.0 || 0
|-
! scope="row" style="text-align:center" | 1988
|style="text-align:center;"|
| 13 || 4 || 0 || 0 || 34 || 23 || 57 || 13 || 2 || 0.0 || 0.0 || 8.5 || 5.8 || 14.3 || 3.3 || 0.5 || 0
|- style="background-color: #EAEAEA"
! scope="row" style="text-align:center" | 1989
|style="text-align:center;"|
| 13 || 0 || – || – || – || – || – || – || – || – || – || – || – || – || – || – || 0
|-
! scope="row" style="text-align:center" | 1990
|style="text-align:center;"|
| 13 || 18 || 7 || 5 || 170 || 73 || 243 || 45 || 12 || 0.4 || 0.3 || 9.4 || 4.1 || 13.5 || 2.5 || 0.7 || 0
|- style="background-color: #EAEAEA"
! scope="row" style="text-align:center" | 1991
|style="text-align:center;"|
| 13 || 11 || 2 || 1 || 132 || 42 || 174 || 32 || 22 || 0.2 || 0.1 || 12.0 || 3.8 || 15.8 || 2.9 || 2.0 || 0
|-
! scope="row" style="text-align:center" | 1992
|style="text-align:center;"|
| 13 || 22 || 1 || 1 || 289 || 124 || 413 || 79 || 41 || 0.0 || 0.0 || 13.1 || 5.6 || 18.8 || 3.6 || 1.9 || 0
|- style="background-color: #EAEAEA"
! scope="row" style="text-align:center" | 1993
|style="text-align:center;"|
| 13 || 20 || 0 || 3 || 229 || 128 || 357 || 65 || 42 || 0.0 || 0.2 || 11.5 || 6.4 || 17.9 || 3.3 || 2.1 || 6
|-
! scope="row" style="text-align:center" | 1994
|style="text-align:center;"|
| 13 || 11 || 0 || 0 || 75 || 51 || 126 || 29 || 11 || 0.0 || 0.0 || 6.8 || 4.6 || 11.5 || 2.6 || 1.0 || 0
|- style="background-color: #EAEAEA"
! scope="row" style="text-align:center" | 1995
|style="text-align:center;"|
| 13 || 21 || 0 || 0 || 175 || 75 || 250 || 39 || 21 || 0.0 || 0.0 || 8.3 || 3.6 || 11.9 || 1.9 || 1.0 || 0
|-
! scope="row" style="text-align:center" | 1996
|style="text-align:center;"|
| 13 || 5 || 0 || 1 || 32 || 16 || 48 || 11 || 10 || 0.0 || 0.2 || 6.4 || 3.2 || 9.6 || 2.2 || 2.0 || 0
|- class="sortbottom"
! colspan=3| Career
! 114
! 10
! 11
! 1146
! 536
! 1682
! 315
! 161
! 0.1
! 0.1
! 10.1
! 4.7
! 14.8
! 2.8
! 1.4
! 6
|}

Coaching statistics
Statistics are correct to the end of the 2019 season

|- style="background-color: #EAEAEA"
! scope="row" style="font-weight:normal"|2013
|
| 1 || 0 || 1 || 0 || 0.0% ||  || 18
|-
! scope="row" style="font-weight:normal"|2014
|
| 22 || 4 || 18 || 0 || 18.2% || 18 || 18
|- style="background-color: #EAEAEA"
! scope="row" style="font-weight:normal"|2015
|
| 22 || 6 || 15 || 1 || 29.5% || 14 || 18
|-
! scope="row" style="font-weight:normal"|2016
|
| 22 || 12 || 10 || 0 || 54.6% || 9 || 18
|-
! scope="row" style="font-weight:normal"|2017
|
| 22 || 11 || 11 || 0 || 50.0% || 11 || 18
|-
! scope="row" style="font-weight:normal"|2018
|
| 22 || 4 || 17 || 1 || 20.5% || 16 || 18
|-
! scope="row" style="font-weight:normal"|2019
|
| 16 || 6 || 10 || 0 || 37.5% || 15 || 18
|- class="sortbottom"
! colspan=2| Career totals
! 127
! 43
! 82
! 2
! 34.7%
! colspan=2|
|}

References

External links

1965 births
Australian rules footballers from Victoria (Australia)
Collingwood Football Club players
Coburg Football Club coaches
Port Adelaide Football Club coaches
St Kilda Football Club coaches
Living people